Here follows a list of notable alumni, non-graduate attendees, faculty, and presidents of the University of Rochester. The institution has more than 120,000 living alumni as of 2022.

Note: Some individuals are listed in multiple categories (e.g., alumni who were also members of the faculty). In such cases, a parenthetical note identifies the second relevant category. Recipients of honorary degrees from the university are not included. All degree years are for bachelor's degrees unless otherwise noted.

Notable alumni

Nobel laureates

National Medal winners

National academy members
Alumni listed here were elected to the National Academies of Sciences, Engineering, and Medicine, the American Academy of Arts and Sciences, the American Academy of Arts and Letters, or national academies outside the United States.

Academia

Institutional leaders

Professors and researchers

Arts
Alumni listed here are notable for their work in the performing arts, visual arts, or arts administration.

Business

Government and law

Heads of state or government

Members of the United States Congress

United States ambassadors

Federal officials in the United States

Federal officials outside the United States

State officials in the United States

Others

Journalism
Alumni listed here are notable for their journalism in newspapers, television, radio, or other media.

Literature
Alumni listed here are notable as authors of drama, fiction, nonfiction, or poetry.

Military

Religion

Science and technology

Sports

Uncategorized

Notable non-graduate attendees

Notable faculty

Nobel laureates

National Medal winners

National academy members
Faculty listed here were elected to the National Academies of Sciences, Engineering, and Medicine, the American Academy of Arts and Sciences, the American Academy of Arts and Letters, or national academies outside the United States.

Engineering and mathematics

Humanities

Natural sciences

Social sciences

Presidents of the University

References

University of Rochester people